Scouting in Georgia has a long history, from the 1910s to the present day, serving thousands of youth in programs that suit the environment in which they live. The state is home to many milestones for the Scouting movement. The Girl Scout Birthplace is located in Savannah, and President Jimmy Carter served as a Scoutmaster in Plains, Georgia.

Boy Scouts of America

History
Dating back to 1920, Boy Scouts of America (BSA) was prominent in Georgia. Until 1974, some southern councils were racially segregated. (The Old Hickory council did not integrate until 1974.) Colored Troops, as they were officially known, were given little support from Districts and Councils. Some Scouting executives and leaders believed that Colored Scouts and Leaders would be less able to live up to the ideals of Scouting.

Historic councils

Boy Scouts of America today
There are eleven active local BSA councils that serve Scouts in Georgia. Active councils, districts, and lodges are shown in green.

Atlanta Area Council

The Atlanta Area Council encompasses 13 counties in northern Georgia. The council office is currently located in Atlanta, Georgia.

Central Georgia Council

The Central Georgia Council serves 24 counties in central Georgia.

Chattahoochee Council
The Chattahoochee Council serves Scouts in Georgia and Alabama, with the Council office located in Columbus, Georgia. Active from 1964 to present, the council's name refers to the Chattahoochee River, which flows through Georgia, Alabama, and Florida.

George H. Lanier District
Saugahatchee District
Muskogee District
Yellow Jacket District

OA lodge: Chattahoochee Lodge #204 chartered 1941 and still active. Absorbed Hiawassee Lodge #333 (West Georgia Council) in 1963.  Absorbed Wehadkee Lodge #273 (George H. Lanier Council, West Point) in both 1964 and 1990.

Alapaha
Apatschin
Hiawassee
Si-tan-mico
Wehadkee
Weracoba
Wischixin

Cherokee Area Council
CherokeeAreaBSA.com

Cherokee Area Council serves Scouts in Tennessee and Georgia, with the council office located in Chattanooga, Tennessee.
The John Ross District serves Northwest Georgia Walker, Catoosa and Dade Counties.
Website: www.CherokeeAreaBSA.com.
Skymont Scout Reservation offers year-round and summer camping opportunities, www.Skymont.org.

Coastal Georgia Council
The Council office of the Coastal Georgia Council is located in Savannah, Georgia.  It was formed on March 1, 2014 when the Coastal Empire Council and the Okefenokee Area Council merged.

Districts
Altamaha
Atlantic
Coastal
Satilla 
Twin Rivers

OA lodge
Tomo-Chi-Chi Lodge #119 chartered 1938 and merged with Pithlako Lodge with the 2014 merger into I-Tsu-La Lodge.
Blue Heron
Canoochee
Creek
Ogeechee
Allogagan
Guale
Tomo Chi Chi

Flint River Council

Flint River Council is headquartered in Griffin, Georgia.

Georgia-Carolina Council
Name active from 1941 to currently active. Council office located in Augusta, Georgia, includes districts in South Carolina and Georgia. Website: 

Creek River District
Kiokee River District
Yamasee District

OA lodge: Bob White Lodge #87 chartered 1936 and still active.
Creek River
Kiokee River
Yamasee

Northeast Georgia Council

Name active from 1935 to currently active. Council office located in Pendergrass, Georgia.
 
Districts:
 Apalachee District serves northern Gwinnett County;
 Chattahoochee District serves Barrow, Hall, and Jackson counties;
 Cherokee district serves Hart, Elbert, Franklin, Madison, Clarke, Oglethorpe, Oconee, Morgan, and Greene counties;
 Currahee District serves Banks, Habersham, Rabun, Stephens, and White counties;
 Etowah District serves Forsyth, Dawson, and Lumpkin counties;
 Mountain District serves Gilmer, Fannin, Towns, and Union counties;
 Sweetwater District serves Walton and southern Gwinnett counties.

OA lodge: Mowogo Lodge #243 chartered in 1943 and still active.
 Ani-gatogewi
 Canantutlaga
 Japeechen
 Jutaculla
 Lau In Nih
 Machque
 Yonah-hi

Camps:
 Rainey Mountain
 Scoutland
 Rotary

Northwest Georgia Council

Northwest Georgia Council serves Scouts in northwest Georgia.

South Georgia Council

Suwannee River Area Council

The Suwannee River Area Council, active from 1924 to present, encompasses 13 counties in north Florida and south Georgia.  The Council Service Center and central headquarters are in Tallahassee, Florida.

Girl Scouting today

The Girl Scout Birthplace is located in Savannah, Georgia, which was the Gordon family home that now provides tours to thousands of Scouts every year. Upon Juliette Gordon Low's death in 1927, she willed her carriage house, eventually named The Girl Scout First Headquarters, to the local Savannah Girl Scouts for continued use.

In 2008 the eight Girl Scout Councils in Georgia merged to form two councils.  In addition Girl Scouts of Moccasin Bend headquartered in Tennessee covers Catoosa, Chattooga, Dade and Walker Counties in northwestern Georgia.

Girl Scouts of Historic Georgia 

Girl Scouts of Historic Georgia was formed on May 1, 2008 by the merger of eight previous councils:
Girl Scouts, Central Savannah River Council;
Girl Scouts of Concharty Council;
Girl Scouts of Middle Georgia;
Girl Scouts of Northeast Georgia;
Girl Scouts of Southwest Georgia;
and The Girl Scout Council of Savannah, Georgia.
Though some counties in these old councils were moved to Girl Scouts
of Greater Atlanta.  This council also covers part of South Carolina and Russell County in Alabama.

Headquarters: Lizella, Georgia 
Website: http://www.gshg.org/

Camps:
Camp Low is on a  barrier island, Rose Dhu Island, near Savannah

The following camps were closed in 2016 and either sold or their lease ended
(leased)
It is leased from the United States Army Corps of Engineers.

Girl Scouts of Greater Atlanta 

Girl Scouts of Greater Atlanta serves about 42,000 girls and 17,000
adult volunteers in 34 counties of Greater Atlanta and a portion of
Polk County Tennessee.  It was formed in 2008 by the merger of
Girl Scout Council of Northwest Georgia and Girl Scouts of Pine Valley
Council.

Headquarters: Atlanta, Georgia
Website: http://www.girlscoutsatl.org/

Camps:
Camp Meriwether in Luthersville, Georgia has 
Camp Misty Mountain in Armuchee, Georgia has  on the edge of the Appalachians
Camp Pine Acres in Acworth, Georgia is adjacent to Lake Allatoona and next to Red Top Mountain State Park
Camp Pine Valley in Meansville, Georgia has  of pines and lakes.
Camp Timber Ridge in Mableton, Georgia has  and was established in 1924

See also

References

External links
 
 
 
 
 
 
 
 
 
 
 
 
 
 
 

Youth organizations based in Georgia (U.S. state)
Georgia
Southern Region (Boy Scouts of America)